The Kachō no Miya is the Imperial Branch House miyake established in the fourth year of the Keiou Era, or 1868, by the twelfth prince of Fushimi no Miya Kuniie, named Kacho no Miya Hirotsune. In the thirteenth year of the Taisho Era, or 1924, the Kacho family succeeded as a marquis branch kousyaku, (the second of the five ranks in the five-rank Imperial System, below prince but above count).

Currently, the Kacho no Miya residence is located in the Tokyo metropolitan area, in the fourth district chome of the Mita area. The remains are located nearby the Kamezuka Children's Park, and is generally accessible to the public.

Additionally, in the fourth year of Showa, or 1929, in Kamakura-shi, Kachou Hironobu established a residence. In the fourth year of Heisei, or 1996, the city of Kamakura-shi acquired the land, and it is now more popularly known as kyuu-Kachou no Miya Yashiki, or the former residence of Kachou no Miya. There is an outdoor garden portion that is generally open to the public.

Kwachō-no-miya
The Kwachō-no-miya (or Kachō-no-miya) house was formed by Prince Hirotsune, son of Prince Fushimi Kuniye.

Kacho-no-miya Hirotsune
Kacho-no-miya Hirotsune was born in the fourth year of the Kaei era, or 1851. As the nephew of Emperor Koumei, he was pronounced as an imperial prince. He cut his hair to enter the Chion'in Jodo Buddhist monastery, and took the name of Sonshuu. After the Meiji Restoration, he quit the order, and he established a household named after the sacred mountain, Kacho, which was affiliated with the Chion'in monastery. He was appointed in a position to oversee Japanese schools and a position in the danjyoudai, an inspection board. Afterward, he decided to pursue the path of a naval soldier, and in the third year of Meiji (1870), he spent time as a foreign exchange student at the Annapolis Naval Academy in the United States of America. In the sixth year of Meiji (1873), he returned to Japan. In 1876 he was assigned a post as major general, but at the young age of 26, died.

References